The 2009 Waterford Senior Football Championship, the most recent championship of the Waterford Senior Football Championship, the premier Gaelic Football competition in County Waterford, commenced on 16 May 2009 and concluded on 1 November 2009.  The thirteen teams in the championship were structured into two groups of four teams and one group of five teams.  From these groups, quarter finals and semi-finals were played with the county final being played in Fraher Field. The championship was won by Stradbally, which defeated The Nire in the final.

Group A

Standings

Matches

Group B

Standings

Matches

Group C

Standings

Matches

Round of 16

Relegation play-offs

Knockout stages

References

Waterford Senior Football Championship
Waterford Senior Football Championship